Eugeniusz Kłopotek (born 15 November 1953 in Chojnice, Poland) is a Polish politician who is a member of the Sejm of Poland (1997-2005 and since 2007), member of the European Parliament (2004) and member of the Kuyavian-Pomeranian Regional Assembly (2006-2007).

Between 1982 and 1988 he was a Head of Gmina Warlubie; currently Vogt (Wójt). Until 1990, he working in Bydgoszcz Voivodeship Office as vice-director of the Department of Agriculture. Between 1994 and 1997 he was a vice-voivode of Bydgoszcz Voivodeship (Wicewojewoda Bydgoski).

After the 1997 Polish parliamentary election he was elected a member of the Sejm III term.

In 2001 Polish parliamentary election he was started to the Sejm IV Term from 4 Bydgoszcz district. He was the best polled on the Polish People's Party (PSL) list and was elected to the Sejm. Between April 2003 (signed of Treaty of Accession 2003) and 31 April 2004, Eugeniusz Kłopotek was a Sejm' observer in European Parliament. Between 1 May and 19 July he was a not-election Member of the European Parliament V Term.

In 2004 European Parliament election he was a candidate of Polish People's Party from Kuyavian-Pomeranian constituency. He polled 10,850 votes and was not elected.

In 2005 Polish parliamentary election he was started to the Sejm V Term from 4 Bydgoszcz district. He polled 7,006 votes and was first on the Polish People's Party (PSL) list. Kłopotek was not elected. When Zbigniew Sosnowski from 5 Toruń district resign from his seat in the Sejm, new member was Andrzej Kłopotek, Eugeniusz' brother.

In 2006 Polish local election he joined the Kuyavian-Pomeranian Regional Assembly III term representing the 2nd district. He polled 13,857 votes and was first on the Polish People's Party (PSL) list. His term was end, when he was elected to Sejm in 2007.

In 2007 parliamentary election he back to the Sejm of Poland VI term (lower house of the Polish parliament) representing the 4 Bydgoszcz district. He polled 12,975 votes. His brother Andrzej was not elected to the Sejm.

In 2009 European Parliament election he is a candidate of Polish People's Party from Kuyavian-Pomeranian constituency.

See also 
 Members of the European Parliament for Poland 2004 (May–July)
 Bydgoszcz

References

External links 

 www.Klopotek.pl
 Kłopotek as MEP 2004
 (pl) Kłopotek at Sejm VI Term webside

1964 births
Living people
People from Chojnice
Members of the Polish Sejm 1997–2001
Members of the Polish Sejm 2001–2005
Members of the Polish Sejm 2007–2011
Members of Kuyavian-Pomeranian Regional Assembly
Polish People's Party MEPs
MEPs for Poland 2004
Members of the Polish Sejm 2011–2015